The 2016 NCAA Division I Women's Lacrosse Championship was the 35th annual single-elimination tournament to determine the national champion of Division I NCAA women's college lacrosse. The semifinal and championship rounds were played at Talen Energy Stadium (the home of Major League Soccer's Philadelphia Union) in Chester, Pennsylvania from May 27–29, 2016. All other rounds were played at campus sites, usually at the home field of the higher-seeded team, from May 13–22.

Tournament field
All NCAA Division I women's lacrosse programs were eligible for this championship, and a total of 26 teams were invited to participate. 13 teams qualified automatically by winning their conference tournaments while the remaining 13 teams qualified at-large based on their regular season records.

Seeds

1. Maryland (19-0)
2. Florida (18-1)
3. North Carolina (16-2)
4. Syracuse (17-5)
5. USC (19-0)
6. Notre Dame (13-6)
7. Penn (13-4)
8. Cornell (13-4)

Teams

Bracket

See also 
 NCAA Division II Women's Lacrosse Championship 
 NCAA Division III Women's Lacrosse Championship
 2016 NCAA Division I Men's Lacrosse Championship

References

NCAA Division I Women's Lacrosse Championship
 
NCAA Women's Lacrosse Championship
NCAA Division I Women's Lacrosse